Ellison Provincial Park is a provincial park in British Columbia, Canada, located on the east side of Okanagan Lake to the south of the city of Vernon.

Name origin
The park is named for Price Ellison (1852–1932), who emigrated to British Columbia in 1876 from Manchester, settling in this area and engaging in stock raising and wheat growing.  A provincial MLA from 1898 to 1916, he was appointed to cabinet posts in the government of Sir Richard McBride - Commissioner of Lands, 1909, and Minister of Finance and Agriculture, 1910.

External links
 British Columbia outdoor community

References

Provincial parks in the Okanagan
Provincial parks of British Columbia
1962 establishments in British Columbia
Protected areas established in 1962
Osoyoos Division Yale Land District